The Meister des Göttinger Barfüßeraltars (Master of the Göttingen Franciscan Altarpiece) was a Gothic German painter in Göttingen known for the creation of a large altarpiece in the Franciscan Church there in 1424. Although the church was demolished in around 1824, the altarpiece can be seen in the Lower Saxony State Museum (Niedersächsisches Landesmuseum) in Hanover. The painting is 7.87 meters wide and 3.06 meters high, the largest preserved Gothic altarpiece in Lower Saxony (Niedersachsen). It was restored in 2005 after six years of work at a cost of 1.2 million euros.

Little is known of the painter himself, although he is also referred to as the Meister der Hildesheimer Magdalenenlegende for a work attributed to him in Hildesheim, at the Magdalenenkirche. The altarpiece panels are now housed in a variety of different museums. For instance the Noli me tangere is in the Staatsgalerie Stuttgart. These scenes which depict the legend of Mary Magdalene (Magdalenenlegende) are thought to be his earliest known work.

He appears to be influenced by the work of the Meisters der goldenen Tafel in Lüneburg (c. 1415), because some of the background scenes are similar to Conrad von Soest's  Wildunger Altarpiece in Bad Wildungen (c. 1403). His work is considered one of the last examples of the International Gothic period  in northern Germany.

References

Bibliography 
, In: The Grove Dictionary of Art, Macmillan Publishers, 2000, from Artnet.com, at Internet Archive, March 6, 2005

External links 
 Meister des Göttinger Barfüßeraltars: Noli me tangere. Staatsgalerie Stuttgart. Panel from the high altar of the Church of Mary Magdalene (Magdalenenkirche) in Hildesheim

Medieval German painters
Gothic painters
Gothic art
15th-century paintings
Gottinger Barfusseraltars